{{Infobox radio station
| name             = WNWS-FM
| logo             = WNWS-FM logo.png
| logo_size        = 200px
| city             = Jackson, Tennessee
| area             = Jackson
| branding         = Newstalk 101.5
| frequency        = 101.5 MHz
| repeater         =
| airdate          = 
| format           = News Talk Information
| power            = 
| erp              = 2,200 watts
| haat             = 116.0 meters
| class            = A
| facility_id      = 29671
| coordinates      = 
| callsign_meaning = New's-Talk Note: now WMRZ
| former_callsigns = WVYG (1991–1993)
| owner            = Radiocorp of Jackson, Inc.
| licensee         = 
| sister_stations  = 
| webcast          = Listen Live
| website          = wnws.com
| affiliations     = CBS Radio, Westwood One 
}}WNWS-FM''' (101.5 FM) is a radio station  broadcasting a News Talk Information format. Licensed to Jackson, Tennessee, United States, the station serves the Jackson area.  The station is currently owned by Radiocorp of Jackson, Inc. and features programing from CBS Radio and Westwood One.

The station airs Dave Ramsey's financial affairs show, as well as local programs The 180 hosted by Dan Reaves (not the former National Football League head coach), and Sea Bass, Mid-Day Smack hosted by Mike Doles and Danny Keith, The Afternoon Show hosted by Keith Sherley and The Cheap Seats hosted by Sea Bass (a sports talk show).  Greg Wood and Coleman Smith host the morning show Daybreak.''

The station also broadcasts live video streams of High School Football and Basketball for 6 high schools in and around Jackson, TN. The teams include University School of Jackson, Crockett County High School, Chester County High School, South Gibson High School, and Haywood County High School, plus a game of the week for one of the three Jackson Madison County Public Schools including Jackson South Side, Jackson North Side, and Liberty Tech.

History
The WNWS callsign was previously assigned to the Miami/Ft. Lauderdale market to a 24/7 News station located at 790 on the AM dial.  The station operated in North Miami-Dade County, Florida.  When the station was sold off, a tombstone was placed in front of the building by then WIOD talk show hosts Neil Rogers and Rick & Suds to mock the insignificance the station had in the area over the years it operated.
WNWS Tombstone

References

External links

NWS-FM
News and talk radio stations in the United States